Gravicembalo may refer to:

The harpsichord (a corruption of the Italian term clavicembalo)
The piano (originally called gravicembalo col piano e forte by its inventor, Bartolomeo Cristofori)